The following is a timeline of the history of the city of Samara, Russia.

Prior to 20th century

 1586 - Fortress established.
 1685 - Cathedral built.
 1824 - September: Tsar Alexander I visits town.
 1850
 Samara government established.
  founded.
 1851 - Strukovsky Garden opens.
 1871 -  becomes mayor.
 1881 -  built.
 1882 - Society of Doctors established.
 1883 - Population: 63,479.
 1894 -  built.
 1897 - Population: 91,672.

20th century

 1913 - Population: 144,000.
 1928 - City becomes part of the Middle Volga Oblast.
 1932 - Botanical Garden State University established.
 1935
 Samara renamed "Kuybyshev" (after Valerian Kuybyshev).
 Cathedral of Christ the Savior demolished.
 1941 - National government relocated to Kuybyshev from Moscow.
 1942 - Football Club Krylia Sovetov Samara formed.
 1943 - National government relocated from Kuybyshev back to Moscow.
 1957 - Metallurg Stadium opens.
 1965 - Population: 948,000.
 1985 - Population: 1,257,000.
 1987 - Kuybyshev Metro begins operating; Kirovskaya (Samara Metro) and Yungorodok (Samara Metro) open.
 1989 - Samara State University founded.
 1991 - Konstantin Titov becomes governor of the Samara Oblast.
 1992 - Sovetskaya (Samara Metro) opens.
 1993
 Samara State Medical University active.
 Gagarinskaya (Samara Metro) and Sportivnaya (Samara Metro) open.
 1997 -  becomes mayor.
 1999 - Samara Mosque built.
 2000 - City becomes part of the Volga Federal District.

21st century

 2002 - Moskovskaya (Samara Metro) opens.
 2007
 Rossiyskaya (Samara Metro) opens.
  becomes governor of the Samara Oblast.
 2010 - Population: 1,164,896.
 2015 - Alabinskaya (Samara Metro) opens.

See also
 Samara history
 History of Samara
 
 
 Other names of Samara e.g. Kuibyshev, Kuybyshev
 Timelines of other cities in the Volga Federal District of Russia: Kazan, Nizhny Novgorod

References

This article incorporates information from the Russian Wikipedia.

Bibliography

External links

Samara, Russia
samara
Years in Russia